Iolaus eurisus, the royal sapphire, is a butterfly in the family Lycaenidae. It is found in Senegal, Guinea, Sierra Leone, Ivory Coast, Ghana, Togo, Nigeria, Cameroon, Equatorial Guinea, Gabon and the Democratic Republic of the Congo. The habitat consists of forests and disturbed and dry areas.

Adult males mud-puddle.

Subspecies
Iolaus eurisus eurisus (Guinea: from Conakry eastwards, Sierra Leone, Ivory Coast, Ghana, Togo, Nigeria: south and the Cross River loop)
Iolaus eurisus helius (Fabricius, 1781) (Senegal, western Guinea)
Iolaus eurisus vexillarius Clench, 1964 (Cameroon, Equatorial Guinea: Bioko, Gabon)

References

External links

Die Gross-Schmetterlinge der Erde 13: Die Afrikanischen Tagfalter. Plate XIII 69 a

Butterflies described in 1779
Iolaus (butterfly)